Christian Carl Due-Boje (born 12 October 1966) is a Swedish former ice hockey player.

He began his career with Hammarby IF in 1983 and joined Djurgårdens IF in 1986.  He remained with the team until 1997 where he moved to Södertälje SK for one season before moving to Germany's Deutsche Eishockey Liga with Star Bulls Rosenheim.  After two seasons, he returned to Elitserien with the Malmö Redhawks for two more seasons before retiring in 2002.  He won a gold medal with Sweden at the 1994 Winter Olympics.

Career statistics

Regular season and playoffs

International

External links

1966 births
Living people
Djurgårdens IF Hockey players
Ice hockey players at the 1994 Winter Olympics
Malmö Redhawks players
Medalists at the 1994 Winter Olympics
Olympic gold medalists for Sweden
Olympic medalists in ice hockey
Södertälje SK players
Starbulls Rosenheim players
Swedish expatriate ice hockey players in Germany
Swedish ice hockey defencemen